Renee Li-Yen Lim (born ) is an Australian actress, television presenter and medical doctor. She is best known for her roles as Constable Jung Lim in East West 101, Mae in Please Like Me and her recurring role as Vivienne Hart in The Secret Daughter.

Early life and education
Lim was born in Perth, Western Australia to Chinese-Malaysian parents who had migrated from Malaysia to Australia in the 1970s. When she was five years old, her parents divorced. Lim was primarily raised by her single father. Her mother moved to Malaysia and remarried, with a Peranakan man. Lim would often travel to Malaysia, where she had family other than her mother, to visit her mother. Lim's father later also remarried, and had a son with his new wife when she was 12 years old.

Lim graduated as the dux of her high school Hampton Senior High School. Few from Lim's high school pursued tertiary studies, and she had initially intended to "be a doctor on weekdays, a lawyer on weekends, an actor on the holidays and a dancer at night".

At 17 years old, Lim moved to Sydney, New South Wales to commence medical studies at the University of New South Wales, graduating with a Bachelor of Medicine, Bachelor of Surgery in 2001.

In 2000, Lim co-directed the University of New South Wales Medical Revue, American Booty (an homage to the 1999 film American Beauty), alongside Keith Lim and Jason Appleby. Also during her university studies, Lim co-authored two academic articles.

Career

Medical career
Lim is a physician, mostly working in part-time, locum posts in emergency medicine, geriatrics, and palliative care departments, and a clinical lecturer at the University of Sydney's Northern Clinical School. She is the Director of Programs at the Pam McLean Centre, an organisation that develops communication training for medical professionals.

Lim considered leaving medical practice altogether to focus on acting; however, she realised that she "love[d] it", adding that "acting is now my job opposed to my hobby".

Entertainment career
As an actor, Lim made ten guest appearances on the Australian hospital drama All Saints as Suzi Lau, and appeared as a regular cast member on SBS's police drama East West 101 as Jung Lim. Lim played Mae, the younger Thai girlfriend of Josh's father, in Please Like Me, and starred in Forget Me Not in 2014, and in The Secret Daughter, Wonderland and Pulse in 2016.

As a presenter she has appeared on the ABC's Ask The Doctors, and on Food Investigators and Destination Flavour.

Lim creates content for Nay In The Life, a multi-platform project that combines video, theatre and written content centred around well-being and personal development.

Filmography

Film

Television

References

External links

Actresses from Perth, Western Australia
Actresses from Sydney
Australian film actresses
21st-century Australian medical doctors
Australian people of Chinese descent
Australian people of Malaysian descent
Australian television actresses
Australian television presenters
Living people
University of New South Wales Medical School alumni
1970s births
Australian women television presenters
Australian actresses of Asian descent